The National Baseball Hall of Fame and Museum in Cooperstown, New York, honors individuals who have excelled in playing, managing, and serving the sport, and is the central point for the study of the history of baseball in the United States and beyond, displaying baseball-related artifacts and exhibits. Elections of worthy individuals to be honored by induction into the Hall of Fame commenced in 1936, although the first induction ceremonies were not held until the hall opened in 1939. Each is listed showing his primary position; that is, the position or role in which the player made his greatest contribution to baseball according to the Hall of Fame.

According to the current rules, players must have at least 10 years of major league experience to be eligible for induction. In addition, they must be retired for at least five years if living, or deceased for at least six months. Players meeting these qualifications must pass through a screening committee, and are then voted on by the Baseball Writers' Association of America (BBWAA). Each writer may vote for up to 10 players; to be admitted into the Hall of Fame, a player must be approved by 75% of those casting ballots. Players receiving less than 5% approval are removed from future BBWAA ballots. The rules, as revised in July 2016, allow that all individuals eligible for induction but not for the BBWAA ballot—players who have not been approved by the BBWAA election process within 15 years of their retirement, umpires, managers, pioneers, and executives—may be considered by one of four voting bodies that have taken over the role of the former Veterans Committee, based on the era in which each individual candidate made his greatest contribution to the sport. On a few occasions, exceptions have been made to the guidelines in place at the time: Lou Gehrig was elected in 1939 following his diagnosis of amyotrophic lateral sclerosis; Roberto Clemente was elected shortly after his death in 1972; and Addie Joss was elected in 1978 even though he completed only nine seasons before his death.

Between 1971 and 1977, nine players from the Negro leagues were inducted by a special Negro Leagues Committee, which was given the task of identifying worthy players who played in the Negro leagues prior to the breaking of baseball's color line. Since 1977, players from the Negro leagues have been considered by the Veterans Committee, and nine more individuals have been approved by that body. In 2005, the Hall announced the formation of a Committee on African-American Baseball, which held a 2006 election for eligible figures from the Negro leagues and earlier 19th-century teams; 17 additional Negro leagues figures were chosen in that election, including executive Effa Manley, the first woman inducted.

Key

Members

In the table below, "primary team" is based on the inductees' biographies at the Hall of Fame website. This does not necessarily match the cap logo on the inductee's Hall of Fame plaque (if applicable; those inducted as executives are shown without caps, and many early players are depicted without cap logos because logos were not in use during the individuals' careers).

Notes
 Prior to the 2001 re-organization of the Veterans Committee, the percentage of the vote generally was not released for players selected by the Committee.
 Percentage of the vote was not released for players approved by the Committee on African American Baseball (2006).
 Ford Frick's two tenures as an executive included his stints as the president of the National League (1934–1951) and Commissioner of Baseball (1951–1965).
 Lou Gehrig was elected by acclamation at the December 1939 winter meetings of the BBWAA.
 There were no regular elections in 1940, 1941, 1943, and 1944, as the Hall decided to hold elections every three years as opposed to annually. Landis was elected in a special election shortly after his death in November 1944. Annual elections resumed in 1946, one year after the end of World War II.
 There was no event in 2020 because of the COVID-19 pandemic and concerns over the members of the Hall who were able to attend the event.  The extended Class of 2021 features those elected in December 2019 (veterans' committee), January 2020 (BBWAA), and January 2021 (BBWAA).  The planned December 2020 Veterans Committee elections, in the Golden Age and Early Baseball Eras, were postponed until December 2021.

Cap logos

See also

Baseball Hall of Fame balloting, by year
List of members of the Mexican Professional Baseball Hall of Fame
List of members of the Cuban Baseball Hall of Fame
List of members of the Japanese Baseball Hall of Fame

References
General
 
 

Inline citations

External links

 Baseball Hall of Fame biographies

Hall of Fame